Mihijam is a town and a notified area in the Jamtara Sadar subdivision of the Jamtara district in the Indian state of Jharkhand.

Geography

Location
Mihijam is located at

Overview
The map shows a large area, which is a plateau with low hills, except in the eastern portion where the Rajmahal hills intrude into this area and the Ramgarh hills are there. The south-western portion is just a rolling upland. The entire area is overwhelmingly rural with only small pockets of urbanisation.

Note: The full screen map is interesting. All places marked on the map are linked in the full screen map and one can easily move on to another page of his/her choice. Enlarge the full screen map to see what else is there – one gets railway connections, many more road connections and so on.

History
In 1922, Mahendranath Gupta lived in Mihijam for nine months.

Transport
The city has a bus stand in front of the Chittaranjan railway station. The Bus stand hosts many buses either originating or coming from different parts of Jharkhand, Bihar and West Bengal, Further the Chittaranjan Railway Station helps it connect with almost all of the cities in India directly through train service. 
Nearest domestic airport is Kazi Nazrul Islam Airport Durgapur.

Other Notable details
It is well known for Homeopathy. The Homoeopathic Medical College and Hospital of Mihijam affiliated to Vinoba Bhave University Jamtara, Jharkhand, India was the first Homeopathic college in India and hence it is very popular among students.

References

Cities and towns in Jamtara district